Aeroprogress is a Russian aircraft design company based in Moscow. Aircraft are certified by subsidiary company the ROKS-AERO Aviation Design Bureau.

Aircraft
T-101 Gratch
A passenger and cargo aircraft first flown in 1994 and manufactured by MAPO-MiG, powered by a TVD-10B turboprop.
T-201 Aist
First flown in 1995 a single-engine STOL utility aircraft powered y a Pratt & Whitney Canada PT6-67K turboporop.
T-203 Pchel
An agricultural variant of T-201 with low-mounted wings and spray-bars.
T-411 Aist
Light utility monoplane manufactured by the Khrunichev State Research and Production Space Center. Marketed in the US as the "Aeroprogress T-411 Wolverine".

Projects
T-106
Twin-engined variant of the T-101.
T-110
Lengthened variant of the T-106.
T-112
Cargo variant of the T-106 with a rear ramp.
T-121 Grif
Single-engined high-wing utility aircraft powered by a TVD=10B turboprop.
T-130 Fregat
Amphibious flying-boat with room for 15 passengers.
T-132
Amphibious flying-boat variant of the T106.
T-134
Variant of the T-130 for coast guard use.
T-204 Progress
Twin-engined passenger/cargo aircraft for 9-12 passengers.
T-205
PT6A powered utility aircraft.
T-401 Sokol
Light general-purpose high-wing aircraft.
T-407 Skborets
Single-engined Light utility aircraft, prototype built by Krunichev.
T-433 Flamingo
Five-seat light amphibious flying boat.
T-435 Korvet
Variant of the T-433 with conventional landing gear.
T-501 Strizh
1990s project for a two-seat basic trainer for the Russian Air Force, to be powered by a single OMSK/Glushenkov TVD-10B turboprop. In 1992 three prototypes were under construction by MAPO-MIG, while it was intended that production aircraft would have been built by Khrunichev.
T-504 Borets
A Twin-seat twin-boom design for a combat trainer powered by two TVD-10B turoprops.
T-610 Voyage
STOL multi-purpose single-engined utility aircraft.
T-710 Anaconda
Two-seat all-weather STOL strike aircraft.
T-720
Lightweight two-seat combat aircraft powered by a TVD-1500 turboprop driving a six-bladed pusher propeller.
T-730
Two-seat light attack aircraft and trainer powered by a Soyuz TVD-450 turoprop driving a 6-bladed pusher propeller.
T-752 Shytk
Wing-in-ground-effect strike aircraft powered by two Klimov TV7-117M2 turboprops.
T-910 Kuryer
Single turbofan powered business jet.

See also

References

External links

Aircraft manufacturers of Russia
Companies based in Moscow